In seven-dimensional Euclidean geometry, the quarter 7-cubic honeycomb is a uniform space-filling tessellation (or honeycomb). It has half the vertices of the 7-demicubic honeycomb, and a quarter of the vertices of a 7-cube honeycomb. Its facets are 7-demicubes, pentellated 7-demicubes, and {31,1,1}×{3,3} duoprisms.

Related honeycombs

See also 
Regular and uniform honeycombs in 7-space:
7-cube honeycomb
7-demicube honeycomb
7-simplex honeycomb
Truncated 7-simplex honeycomb
Omnitruncated 7-simplex honeycomb

Notes

References 
 Kaleidoscopes: Selected Writings of H. S. M. Coxeter, edited by F. Arthur Sherk, Peter McMullen, Anthony C. Thompson, Asia Ivic Weiss, Wiley-Interscience Publication, 1995,  
 (Paper 24) H.S.M. Coxeter, Regular and Semi-Regular Polytopes III, [Math. Zeit. 200 (1988) 3-45] See p318 
 

Honeycombs (geometry)
8-polytopes